Honeymoon Lane may refer to:

 Honeymoon Lane (musical), 1926 Broadway musical
 Honeymoon Lane (film), 1931 film based on the musical